Come Dine with Me Ireland is an Irish television programme, first broadcast on TV3 on 6 June 2011. The show has five amateur chefs competing against each other hosting a dinner party for the other contestants. Each competitor then rates the host's performance with the winner winning a €1,000 cash prize. It is based on the British format Come Dine with Me, which airs globally on various television networks. Between January 2011 to June 2011 TV3 broadcast the UK version at 18:30 each week night. Like the UK version, the Irish version includes an element of comedy through comedian Dave Lamb, who provides a dry and "bitingly sarcastic" narration. A second series of the show, including two celebrity specials, aired as part of TV3's autumn schedule.

The show was later broadcast internationally on Channel 4 and More 4 in the UK where it was titled Come Dine with Me Ireland.

First series

Second series

References

External links

2011 Irish television series debuts
2013 Irish television series endings
Come Dine With Me
Cooking competitions
English-language television shows
Irish reality television series
Irish television series based on British television series
Television series by ITV Studios
Virgin Media Television (Ireland) original programming